Raymond Lee (born April 26, 1993) is an American professional soccer who plays as a defender for the Kansas City Comets in the Major Arena Soccer League.

Career

Amateur
Lee played four years of college soccer at the Saint Louis University between 2011 and 2014. Prior to college, Lee played for the academy of Sporting Kansas City.

Professional
On January 20, 2015, Lee was picked 71st overall in the 2015 MLS SuperDraft by Philadelphia Union. Lee signed with Philadelphia on March 3, 2015.

Lee signed with United Soccer League side Bethlehem Steel on January 29, 2016, but was released by the club before the start of the season after falling down the depth chart at left back. He instead joined Tulsa Roughnecks on March 25.

Lee joined USL side Rochester Rhinos in March 2017.

Lee signed with USL side Pittsburgh Riverhounds SC on December 15, 2017.

On January 17, 2019, Lee joined USL Championship club Hartford Athletic.

Honors
Individual
MASL All-Rookie First Team: 2019-20
All-MASL Second Team: 2021

References

External links

 
 
 

1993 births
Living people
American soccer players
Saint Louis Billikens men's soccer players
Philadelphia Union players
Penn FC players
Philadelphia Union II players
FC Tulsa players
Rochester New York FC players
Pittsburgh Riverhounds SC players
Hartford Athletic players
Chattanooga FC players
Association football defenders
Soccer players from Kansas City, Missouri
Philadelphia Union draft picks
Major League Soccer players
USL Championship players
National Independent Soccer Association players
Missouri Comets players
Major Arena Soccer League players